Microcephalin (MCPH1) is a gene that is expressed during fetal brain development. Certain mutations in MCPH1, when homozygous, cause primary microcephaly—a severely diminished brain. Hence, it has been assumed that variants have a role in brain development. However, in normal individuals no effect on mental ability or behavior has yet been demonstrated in either this or another similarly studied microcephaly gene, ASPM. However, an association has been established between normal variation in brain structure, as measured with MRI (i.e., primarily cortical surface area and total brain volume) but only in females, and common genetic variants within both the MCPH1 gene and another similarly studied microcephaly gene, CDK5RAP2.

Structure
Microcephalin proteins contain the following three domains:
 N-terminal BRCT domain
 Central microcephalin protein domain
 C-terminal BRCT domain

Expression in the brain 
MCPH1 is expressed in the fetal brain, in the developing forebrain, and on the walls of the lateral ventricles. Cells of this area divide, producing neurons that migrate to eventually form the cerebral cortex.

Evolution
A derived form of MCPH1 appeared about 37,000 years ago (any time between 14,000 and 60,000 years ago) and has spread to become the most common form of microcephalin throughout the world except Sub-Saharan Africa; this rapid spread suggests a selective sweep.  However, scientists have not identified the evolutionary pressures that may have caused the spread of these mutations.  This variant of the gene is thought to contribute to increased brain volume and may correlate with the incidence of tonal languages, though modern distributions of chromosomes bearing the ancestral forms of MCPH1 and ASPM showed neither microcephalin or ASPM had any significant effect on IQ.

The derived form of MCPH1 may have originated from a lineage separated from modern humans approximately 1.1 million years ago and later introgressed into humans. This finding supports the possibility of admixture between modern humans and extinct Homo spp. While Neanderthals have been suggested as the possible source of this haplotype, the haplotype was not found in the individuals used to prepare the first draft of the Neanderthal genome.

Controversy
The research results began to attract considerable controversy in the science world. John Derbyshire wrote that as a result of the findings, "our cherished national dream of a well-mixed and harmonious meritocracy [...] may be unattainable." Richard Lewontin considers the two published papers as "egregious examples of going well beyond the data to try to make a splash." Bruce Lahn maintains that the science of the studies is sound, and freely admits that a direct link between these particular genes and either cognition or intelligence has not been clearly established. Lahn is now engaging himself with other areas of study. Later studies have not found those gene variants to be associated with mental ability or cognition.

Later genetic association studies by Mekel-Bobrov et al. and Evans et al. also reported that the genotype for MCPH1 was under positive selection. An analysis by Timpson et al., found "no meaningful associations with brain size and various cognitive measures". A later 2010 study by Rimol et al. demonstrated a link between brain size and structure and two microcephaly genes, MCPH1 (only in females) and CDK5RAP2 (only in males). In contrast to previous studies, which only considered small numbers of exonic single nucleotide polymorphisms (SNPs) and did not investigate sex-specific effects, this study used microarray technology to genotype a range of SNPs associated with all four MCPH genes, including upstream and downstream regulatory elements, and allowed for separate effects for males and females.

Model organisms 

Model organisms have been used in the study of MCPH1 function. A conditional knockout mouse line, called Mcph1tm1a(EUCOMM)Wtsi was generated as part of the International Knockout Mouse Consortium program — a high-throughput mutagenesis project to generate and distribute animal models of disease to interested scientists.

Male and female animals underwent a standardized phenotypic screen to determine the effects of deletion. Twenty four tests were carried out on mutant mice and six significant abnormalities were observed. Homozygous mutant animals were infertile, did not have a pinna reflex, had a moderate degree of hearing impairment, abnormal cornea morphology, lens morphology and cataracts, and displayed chromosomal instability in a micronucleus test.

MCPH1 is involved in the ATM and ATR-mediated DNA damage response that includes repair of DNA damages.  In humans, neurodevelopmental disorders including microcephaly are often associated with a deficient DNA damage response.  In mice lacking MCPH1, DNA damaging ionizing radiation causes massive apoptosis in the neocortex.  Loss of Mcph1 gene function in mice compromises homologous recombinational repair of DNA damages, thus increasing genomic instability.  MCPH1 facilitation of the DNA damage response appears to be necessary for proper neuroprogenitor cell expansion and differentiation.

Other MCPH genes 
In addition to MCPH1, other genes have been designated MCPH genes based on their role in brain size. These include WDR62 (MCPH2), CDK5RAP2 (MCPH3), KNL1 (MCPH4), ASPM (MCPH5), CENPJ (MCPH6), STIL (MCPH7), CEP135 (MCPH8), CEP152 (MCPH9), ZNF335 (MCPH10), PHC1 (MCPH11) and CDK6 (MCPH12).

Research studies 
In March 2019, Chinese scientists reported inserting the human brain-related MCPH1 gene into laboratory rhesus monkeys, resulting in the transgenic monkeys performing better and answering faster on "short-term memory tests involving matching colors and shapes", compared to control non-transgenic monkeys, according to the researchers.

See also 
 Bruce Lahn
 Genetic determinism
 Race and genetics
 Race and intelligence

References

Further reading

External links 
 "Neanderthal Brains"—a lecture by Bruce Lahn from the NYAS podcasts

Animal genes
Genes mutated in mice
Human evolution